Boay Akonay (3 January 1970 – 29 June 2013) was a Tanzanian long-distance runner who won the bronze medal at the 1992 World Half Marathon Championships.

Achievements

External links
 
 
 Boay Akonay's obituary

1970 births
2013 deaths
Tanzanian male long-distance runners
Olympic athletes of Tanzania
Tanzanian male marathon runners
Athletes (track and field) at the 1988 Summer Olympics